Desulfofrigus fragile is a bacterium. It is a psychrophilic Gram-negative and sulfate-reducing bacteria with type strain Lsv21T.

References

Further reading
Whitman, William B., et al., eds. Bergey's manual® of systematic bacteriology. Vol. 5. Springer, 2012.

External links 
LPSN

WORMS entry
Type strain of Desulfofrigus fragile at BacDive -  the Bacterial Diversity Metadatabase

Desulfobacterales
Bacteria described in 1999
Psychrophiles